The 2001–02 Philadelphia Flyers season was the Philadelphia Flyers 35th season in the National Hockey League (NHL). The Flyers qualified for the playoffs, but lost in the first round.

Off-season
In the off-season, the Flyers re-vamped their lineup by signing star center Jeremy Roenick and veteran defenseman Eric Weinrich. On August 20, 2001, they finally traded Eric Lindros to the New York Rangers for Kim Johnsson, Jan Hlavac, Pavel Brendl and a 2003 third-round draft pick. The Rangers would also receive a 2003 first-round draft pick if Lindros suffered a concussion in the pre-season or the first 50 games of the regular season and didn't return to action for at least 12 months.

Pre-season
On September 20, 2001, in the middle of a 2–2 game between the Flyers and New York Rangers, the game was stopped. A message from United States President George W. Bush about the 9/11 attacks was broadcast on the arena video screen. After the message, the game did not resume and it was declared a 2–2 tie at the end of the 2nd period. Both teams took place in a handshake line following the game, a tradition normally reserved for the end of an elimination game in a Stanley Cup Playoff series.

Regular season
The Flyers began 2001–02 with high expectations and with Roenick leading the team in scoring the Flyers finished with an Atlantic Division title.

Eric Desjardins stepped down as team captain eight games into the season and was replaced by Keith Primeau.

Lindros returned to Philly on January 12, a game which the Flyers took 4–2 in a brutal battle and saw Lindros held scoreless. Lindros did exact a measure of revenge, finishing off a hat trick within the first 22 minutes of a March 2 game at Madison Square Garden. Simon Gagne also scored three times but the Rangers held on for a 6–5 win.

The power play was one of the NHL's worst however and after their top two centermen, Jeremy Roenick and Primeau, suffered injuries the night before the trade deadline, the Flyers acquired Adam Oates from the Washington Capitals. While Oates was the third leading point-producer in the league at the time, the price to acquire him was high. The Flyers parted with top goalie prospect Maxime Ouellet and their first, second, and third-round draft picks in the 2002 NHL Entry Draft.

Season standings

Playoffs
The Flyers set a record for fewest goals scored by a team in a five-game playoff series, scoring only two goals against the Ottawa Senators.

It turned out there was much discontent in the locker room, resulting in Bill Barber and his coaching staff being fired.

Schedule and results

Preseason

|- style="background:#ccc;"
| – || September 15 || @ Washington Capitals || colspan="3" |
|- style="background:#cfc;"
| 1 || September 18 || @ Washington Capitals || 6–1 || 1–0–0 ||
|- style="background:#ffc;"
| 2 || September 20 || New York Rangers || 2–2 || 1–0–1 ||
|- style="background:#ffc;"
| 3 || September 21 || New York Islanders || 5–5 OT || 1–0–2 ||
|- style="background:#ffc;"
| 4 || September 22 || New Jersey Devils || 2–2 OT || 1–0–3 ||
|- style="background:#fcf;"
| 5 || September 23 || @ New York Rangers || 1–2 || 1–1–3 ||
|- style="background:#cfc;"
| 6 || September 25 || Washington Capitals || 6–4 || 2–1–3 ||
|- style="background:#cfc;"
| 7 || September 28 || New York Islanders || 5–2 || 3–1–3 ||
|- style="background:#cfc;"
| 8 || September 29 || @ New Jersey Devils || 5–4 || 4–1–3 ||
|-
| colspan="6" style="text-align:center;"|
Notes:
 Game rescheduled to September 18 due to the September 11 attacks.
 Game declared a tie after two periods.
 Game played at Sovereign Bank Arena in Trenton, New Jersey.
|-

|-
| Legend:

Regular season

|- style="background:#cfc;"
| 1 || October 4 || Florida Panthers || 5–2 || 1–0–0–0 || 2 || 
|- style="background:#ffc;"
| 2 || October 6 || Columbus Blue Jackets || 3–3 OT || 1–0–1–0 || 3 || 
|- style="background:#ffc;"
| 3 || October 8 || @ Columbus Blue Jackets || 2–2 OT || 1–0–2–0 || 4 || 
|- style="background:#fcf;"
| 4 || October 10 || @ Buffalo Sabres || 1–2 || 1–1–2–0 || 4 || 
|- style="background:#cfc;"
| 5 || October 13 || @ Florida Panthers || 5–2 || 2–1–2–0 || 6 || 
|- style="background:#ffc;"
| 6 || October 16 || @ Atlanta Thrashers || 3–3 OT || 2–1–3–0 || 7 || 
|- style="background:#fcf;"
| 7 || October 18 || @ Detroit Red Wings || 2–3 || 2–2–3–0 || 7 || 
|- style="background:#cfc;"
| 8 || October 20 || Washington Capitals || 6–3 || 3–2–3–0 || 9 || 
|- style="background:#fcf;"
| 9 || October 25 || Ottawa Senators || 2–7 || 3–3–3–0 || 9 || 
|- style="background:#cfc;"
| 10 || October 27 || @ Montreal Canadiens || 5–1 || 4–3–3–0 || 11 || 
|- style="background:#cfc;"
| 11 || October 30 || @ Washington Capitals || 3–0 || 5–3–3–0 || 13 || 
|- style="background:#cfc;"
| 12 || October 31 || Pittsburgh Penguins || 3–0 || 6–3–3–0 || 15 || 
|-

|- style="background:#fcf;"
| 13 || November 3 || New York Islanders || 1–2 || 6–4–3–0 || 15 || 
|- style="background:#fcf;"
| 14 || November 6 || @ Chicago Blackhawks || 1–2 || 6–5–3–0 || 15 || 
|- style="background:#cfc;"
| 15 || November 8 || @ Tampa Bay Lightning || 2–1 || 7–5–3–0 || 17 || 
|- style="background:#cfc;"
| 16 || November 10 || @ Florida Panthers || 3–2 OT || 8–5–3–0 || 19 || 
|- style="background:#fcf;"
| 17 || November 14 || @ New York Rangers || 2–4 || 8–6–3–0 || 19 || 
|- style="background:#cfc;"
| 18 || November 15 || Washington Capitals || 5–0 || 9–6–3–0 || 21 || 
|- style="background:#cfc;"
| 19 || November 17 || @ New Jersey Devils || 3–1 || 10–6–3–0 || 23 || 
|- style="background:#ffc;"
| 20 || November 20 || New Jersey Devils || 3–3 OT || 10–6–4–0 || 24 || 
|- style="background:#ffc;"
| 21 || November 23 || @ Dallas Stars || 3–3 OT || 10–6–5–0 || 25 || 
|- style="background:#fcf;"
| 22 || November 25 || Vancouver Canucks || 1–4 || 10–7–5–0 || 25 || 
|-
| 23 || November 29 || Boston Bruins || 2–3 OT || 10–7–5–1 || 26 || 
|-

|- style="background:#cfc;"
| 24 || December 1 || Tampa Bay Lightning || 2–0 || 11–7–5–1 || 28 || 
|- style="background:#cfc;"
| 25 || December 4 || @ New York Islanders || 3–2 || 12–7–5–1 || 30 || 
|- style="background:#fcf;"
| 26 || December 6 || New York Islanders || 0–2 || 12–8–5–1 || 30 || 
|- style="background:#cfc;"
| 27 || December 8 || Minnesota Wild || 5–1 || 13–8–5–1 || 32 || 
|- style="background:#cfc;"
| 28 || December 10 || @ Atlanta Thrashers || 3–1 || 14–8–5–1 || 34 || 
|- style="background:#fcf;"
| 29 || December 13 || Montreal Canadiens || 2–3 || 14–9–5–1 || 34 || 
|- style="background:#cfc;"
| 30 || December 15 || @ Boston Bruins || 5–2 || 15–9–5–1 || 36 || 
|- style="background:#fcf;"
| 31 || December 16 || Edmonton Oilers || 2–3 || 15–10–5–1 || 36 || 
|- style="background:#cfc;"
| 32 || December 18 || St. Louis Blues || 6–3 || 16–10–5–1 || 38 || 
|- style="background:#cfc;"
| 33 || December 20 || Dallas Stars || 2–1 || 17–10–5–1 || 40 || 
|- style="background:#cfc;"
| 34 || December 22 || Carolina Hurricanes || 4–3 OT || 18–10–5–1 || 42 || 
|- style="background:#cfc;"
| 35 || December 26 || @ Washington Capitals || 4–1 || 19–10–5–1 || 44 || 
|- style="background:#fcf;"
| 36 || December 28 || @ Phoenix Coyotes || 2–4 || 19–11–5–1 || 44 || 
|- style="background:#cfc;"
| 37 || December 29 || @ Colorado Avalanche || 5–2 || 20–11–5–1 || 46 || 
|- style="background:#cfc;"
| 38 || December 31 || @ Vancouver Canucks || 2–1 || 21–11–5–1 || 48 || 
|-

|- style="background:#fcf;"
| 39 || January 2 || @ San Jose Sharks || 2–5 || 21–12–5–1 || 48 || 
|- style="background:#cfc;"
| 40 || January 6 || @ Carolina Hurricanes || 4–3 || 22–12–5–1 || 50 || 
|- style="background:#cfc;"
| 41 || January 8 || Atlanta Thrashers || 7–4 || 23–12–5–1 || 52 || 
|- style="background:#cfc;"
| 42 || January 10 || New Jersey Devils || 3–2 || 24–12–5–1 || 54 || 
|- style="background:#cfc;"
| 43 || January 12 || New York Rangers || 4–2 || 25–12–5–1 || 56 || 
|- style="background:#cfc;"
| 44 || January 14 || @ Montreal Canadiens || 5–3 || 26–12–5–1 || 58 || 
|- style="background:#cfc;"
| 45 || January 15 || @ Ottawa Senators || 4–1 || 27–12–5–1 || 60 || 
|- style="background:#cfc;"
| 46 || January 17 || Atlanta Thrashers || 6–3 || 28–12–5–1 || 62 || 
|- style="background:#cfc;"
| 47 || January 19 || @ Toronto Maple Leafs || 3–0 || 29–12–5–1 || 64 || 
|- style="background:#fcf;"
| 48 || January 21 || @ Pittsburgh Penguins || 2–5 || 29–13–5–1 || 64 || 
|- style="background:#ffc;"
| 49 || January 22 || Ottawa Senators || 1–1 OT || 29–13–6–1 || 65 || 
|-
| 50 || January 24 || Nashville Predators || 2–3 OT || 29–13–6–2 || 66 || 
|- style="background:#cfc;"
| 51 || January 26 || Carolina Hurricanes || 4–2 || 30–13–6–2 || 68 || 
|- style="background:#cfc;"
| 52 || January 29 || Pittsburgh Penguins || 3–2 OT || 31–13–6–2 || 70 || 
|- style="background:#fcf;"
| 53 || January 30 || @ Ottawa Senators || 1–3 || 31–14–6–2 || 70 || 
|-

|- style="background:#cfc;"
| 54 || February 4 || @ Los Angeles Kings || 3–1 || 32–14–6–2 || 72 || 
|- style="background:#fcf;"
| 55 || February 6 || @ Mighty Ducks of Anaheim || 4–5 || 32–15–6–2 || 72 || 
|- style="background:#cfc;"
| 56 || February 9 || @ St. Louis Blues || 5–0 || 33–15–6–2 || 74 || 
|-
| 57 || February 12 || New York Islanders || 0–1 OT || 33–15–6–3 || 75 || 
|- style="background:#cfc;"
| 58 || February 26 || Chicago Blackhawks || 5–4 || 34–15–6–3 || 77 || 
|- style="background:#cfc;"
| 59 || February 27 || @ New Jersey Devils || 1–0 || 35–15–6–3 || 79 || 
|-

|- style="background:#fcf;"
| 60 || March 2 || @ New York Rangers || 5–6 || 35–16–6–3 || 79 || 
|- style="background:#cfc;"
| 61 || March 4 || @ Boston Bruins || 4–1 || 36–17–6–3 || 81 || 
|- style="background:#fcf;"
| 62 || March 7 || Calgary Flames || 2–4 || 36–18–6–3 || 81 || 
|- style="background:#cfc;"
| 63 || March 8 || @ Tampa Bay Lightning || 4–2 || 37–18–6–3 || 83 || 
|- style="background:#fcf;"
| 64 || March 10 || Toronto Maple Leafs || 1–3 || 37–19–6–3 || 83 || 
|- style="background:#ffc;"
| 65 || March 12 || @ Toronto Maple Leafs || 1–1 OT || 37–18–7–3 || 84 || 
|- style="background:#fcf;"
| 66 || March 14 || Buffalo Sabres || 1–3 || 37–19–7–3 || 84 || 
|- style="background:#fcf;"
| 67 || March 16 || Colorado Avalanche || 1–2 || 37–20–7–3 || 84 || 
|- style="background:#ffc;"
| 68 || March 18 || Tampa Bay Lightning || 3–3 OT || 37–20–8–3 || 85 || 
|- style="background:#cfc;"
| 69 || March 21 || Mighty Ducks of Anaheim || 2–1 || 38–20–8–3 || 87 || 
|- style="background:#ffc;"
| 70 || March 23 || @ Pittsburgh Penguins || 4–4 OT || 38–20–9–3 || 88 || 
|- style="background:#cfc;"
| 71 || March 25 || Toronto Maple Leafs || 4–1 || 39–20–9–3 || 90 || 
|- style="background:#cfc;"
| 72 || March 27 || @ New York Rangers || 4–2 || 40–20–9–3 || 92 || 
|- style="background:#fcf;"
| 73 || March 28 || @ Carolina Hurricanes || 1–4 || 40–21–9–3 || 92 || 
|- style="background:#fcf;"
| 74 || March 30 || Buffalo Sabres || 1–3 || 40–22–9–3 || 92 || 
|-

|- style="background:#fcf;"
| 75 || April 1 || @ Buffalo Sabres || 1–3 || 40–23–9–3 || 92 || 
|- style="background:#fcf;"
| 76 || April 2 || Boston Bruins || 2–4 || 40–24–9–3 || 92 || 
|- style="background:#fcf;"
| 77 || April 4 || Montreal Canadiens || 1–3 || 40–25–9–3 || 92 || 
|- style="background:#cfc;"
| 78 || April 6 || Pittsburgh Penguins || 3–1 || 41–25–9–3 || 94 || 
|- style="background:#ffc;"
| 79 || April 8 || Florida Panthers || 4–4 OT || 41–25–10–3 || 95 || 
|- style="background:#fcf;"
| 80 || April 10 || @ New Jersey Devils || 0–1 || 41–26–10–3 || 95 || 
|- style="background:#cfc;"
| 81 || April 13 || New York Rangers || 2–1 || 42–26–10–3 || 97 || 
|- style="background:#fcf;"
| 82 || April 14 || @ New York Islanders || 1–3 || 42–27–10–3 || 97 || 
|-

|-
| Legend:

Playoffs

|- style="background:#cfc;"
| 1 || April 17 || Ottawa Senators || 1–0 OT || Flyers lead 1–0 || 
|- style="background:#fcf;"
| 2 || April 20 || Ottawa Senators || 0–3 || Series tied 1–1 || 
|- style="background:#fcf;"
| 3 || April 22 || @ Ottawa Senators || 0–3 || Senators lead 2–1 || 
|- style="background:#fcf;"
| 4 || April 24 || @ Ottawa Senators || 0–3 || Senators lead 3–1 || 
|- style="background:#fcf;"
| 5 || April 26 || Ottawa Senators || 1–2 OT || Senators win 4–1|| 
|-

|-
| Legend:

Player statistics

Scoring
 Position abbreviations: C = Center; D = Defense; G = Goaltender; LW = Left Wing; RW = Right Wing
  = Joined team via a transaction (e.g., trade, waivers, signing) during the season. Stats reflect time with the Flyers only.
  = Left team via a transaction (e.g., trade, waivers, release) during the season. Stats reflect time with the Flyers only.

Goaltending

Awards and records

Awards

Records

Among the team records set during the 2001–02 season was Jiri Dopita scoring four goals against the Atlanta Thrashers on January 8, tying the team record for most goals in a single game. The Flyers recorded three overtime losses for the third consecutive season, tying the franchise mark for fewest. The 40 powerplay goals allowed by the Flyers is also the franchise record for fewest in a season. The two goals the Flyers scored during their conference quarterfinals series against the Ottawa Senators is both the fewest in a playoff year and series in franchise history, and is also the NHL record for fewest goals scored in a five-game playoff series.

Milestones

Transactions
The Flyers were involved in the following transactions from June 10, 2001, the day after the deciding game of the 2001 Stanley Cup Finals, through June 13, 2002, the day of the deciding game of the 2002 Stanley Cup Finals.

Trades

Players acquired

Players lost

Signings

Draft picks

Philadelphia's picks at the 2001 NHL Entry Draft, which was held at the National Car Rental Center in Sunrise, Florida, on June 23–24, 2001. The Flyers traded eight of the nine draft picks originally allotted to them, retaining only their fifth-round pick, 158th overall, and trading the others in seven different trades.

Farm teams
The Flyers were affiliated with the Philadelphia Phantoms of the AHL and the Trenton Titans of the ECHL.

Notes

References
General
 
 
 
Specific

Phil
Phil
Philadelphia Flyers seasons
Philadelphia
Philadelphia